Queda is a genus of beetles in the family Dytiscidae, containing the following species:

 Queda compressa Sharp, 1882
 Queda hydrovatoides Zimmermann, 1921
 Queda youngi Biström, 1990

References

Dytiscidae genera